Lightweighting is a concept in the auto industry about building cars and trucks that are less heavy as a way to achieve better fuel efficiency and handling. Carmakers make parts from carbon fiber, windshields from plastic, and bumpers out of aluminum foam, as ways to lessen vehicle load. Replacing car parts with lighter materials does not lessen overall safety for drivers, according to one view, since many plastics have a high strength-to-weight ratio. 

The search to replace car parts with lighter ones is not limited to any one type of part; according to a spokesman for Ford Motor Company, engineers strive for lightweighting "anywhere we can." Using lightweight materials such as plastics can mean less strain on the engine and better gas mileage as well as improved handling. One material sometimes used to reduce weight is carbon fiber. The auto industry has used the term for many years, as the effort to keep making cars lighter is ongoing. 

Another common material used for lightweighting is aluminum. Incorporating aluminum has grown continuously to not only meet CAFE standards, but to also improve automotive performance. A vehicle with lower weight has better acceleration, braking and handling. In addition, lighter vehicles can tow and haul larger loads because the engine is not carrying unnecessary weight. A light
weighting magazine finds: "Even though aluminum is light, it does not sacrifice strength. Aluminum body structure is equal in strength to steel and can absorb twice as much crash-induced energy."

References

Automotive technologies
Materials science
Environmental engineering